Slowear   S.p.A. is an Italian clothing and accessories company that focuses on brands made in Italy. 
In the US, the company has retail stores in New York City and Chicago.
Its in-house brands include: Zanone, Incotex, Glanshirt, Montedoro and Officina Slowear. The company is based in Venice, Italy.

See also
Monocle magazine
Brunello Cucinelli
Brioni
Canali
Corneliani 
Lardini

References

External links

Clothing companies of Italy
Companies based in Venice